The 1981 FIBA Africa Championship for Women was the 7th FIBA Africa Championship for Women. It was played under the rules of FIBA, the world governing body for basketball, and the FIBA Africa thereof. The tournament was hosted in 1981 by Senegal from September 5 to 12.

Senegal defeated Zaire 83–76 in the final.

Draw

Preliminary round

Group A

Group B

Knockout stage

Semifinals

7th place match

5th place match

Bronze medal match

Final

Final standings

Awards

External links
Official Website

References

1981
Bask
1981 in women's basketball
1981 in African basketball
International women's basketball competitions hosted by Senegal